The Administrative Records Experiment was a project designed to explore technical alternatives to the 2010 United States Census.

See
 Reengineering the 2010 Census: Risks and Challenges. Administrative Records Experiment in 2000 (AREX 2000): Household Level Analysis. Census 2000 Experiment Report. Washington, DC: U.S. Census Bureau. 

United States census